Lithacodia metachrysa is a species of moth in the family Erebidae first described by George Hampson in 1910. It is found in central Madagascar.

References 

Eustrotiinae
Moths of Madagascar
Moths of Africa
Moths described in 1910